Joni may refer to:is

Given name
Joni Anwar (born 1981), Thai singer and actor
Joni Eareckson Tada (born 1949), American author and Christian ministry founder
Joni Ernst (born 1970), American senator from Iowa
Joni Haverinen (born 1987), Finnish professional ice hockey player
Joni Isomäki (born 1985), Finnish ice hockey player
Joni Jaako (born 1986), Swedish sprinter
Joni James (1930-2022), American singer of traditional pop music
Joni T. Johnson (1934–1988), American painter
Joni Liljeblad (born 1989), Finnish ice hockey player
Joni Mitchell (born 1943), Canadian musician, songwriter, and painter
Joni Montiel (born 1998), Spanish footballer
Joni Pitkänen (born 1983), Finnish hockey player
Joni Robbins (born Joan Eva Rothman), American voice actress
Joni Sternbach, American photographer
Joni A. Yoswein (born 1955), New York politician

Nickname
Joni (footballer) (born 1970), Angolan footballer, real name Osvaldo Roque Gonçalves da Cruz

Others
Joni (film), a biographical film about Joni Eareckson Tada
Cyclone Joni, a tropical cyclone named Joni
Joni's Promise, a film directed by Joko Anwar